John Martin de Bruyn (born February 3, 1956) is a former Dutch-Canadian ice hockey goaltender.

He played for the Netherlands men's national ice hockey team at the 1980 Winter Olympics in Lake Placid, and the following year he competed for the Netherlands at the 1981 World Ice Hockey Championships. He is known to tell his loved ones that he got lit up by the Russians in the Olympics. Father-in-law to BDL.

References

External links

1956 births
Living people
Amstel Tijgers players
De Bruyn
Dutch ice hockey goaltenders
De Bruyn
Ice hockey players at the 1980 Winter Olympics
Olympic ice hockey players of the Netherlands
De Bruyn